The national emblem of the Tatar Autonomous Soviet Socialist Republic was adopted in 1937 by the government of the Tatar Autonomous Soviet Socialist Republic. The emblem is identical to the emblem of the Russian Soviet Federative Socialist Republic.

History

First version 
After the formation of the Tatar ASSR, the first emblem of the Tatar ASSR was designed by the outstanding Tatar artist and sculptor Baqi Urmançe in 1920. The emblem had no official status.

Third version

First revision 
On June 25, 1937, the Extraordinary XI Congress of Soviets of the Tatar ASSR adopted the first Constitution of the Tatar ASSR, which was enforced after approval of the constitution by the third session of the Supreme Soviet of the RSFSR of the first convocation on June 2, 1940. The constitution described the emblem of the Tatar ASSR, which is identical with the emblem of the Russian SFSR, but was added with inscriptions in Tatar and Russian languages "Tatar ASSR" and "Workers of the world, unite!"

The emblem itself was approved on October 4, 1937.

Second revision 
May 5, 1939, the Presidium of the Supreme Council of the Tatar ASSR adopted a decree "On the transfer of the Tatar alphabet from the Latin alphabet to the Cyrillic letters", which was approved by the Law of the Tatar ASSR on August 17, 1939. The inscription of the emblem changed according to the decree.

Third revision 
On May 31, 1978, the extraordinary 9th session of the Supreme Council of the Tatar ASSR adopted the new Constitution of the Tatar ASSR. The article 157 of the constitution added a red five-pointed star to the emblem.

The regulation on the arms of the Tatar ASSR was approved by the Decree of the Presidium of the Supreme Council of the Tatar ASSR on June 1, 1981.

References

External links 
Symbols of Tatarstan

Tatar Autonomous Soviet Socialist Republic
Tatar ASSR
Tatar ASSR
Tatar ASSR
Tatar ASSR
Tatar ASSR